Pink Lady Twin Best is a greatest hits album released by Japanese duo Pink Lady in 1995. The album contains all their singles up to 1990, B-sides, and several rare songs.

Track listing 
Disc 1
 
 
 "S.O.S."
 
 
 
 
 
 
 
 
 
 "UFO"
 
 
 
 
 
 
 
 
 
 
 

Disc 2

 
 
 
 
 
 "Kiss in the Dark"
 
 "Do Your Best"
 
 
 
 
 "Last Pretender" 
 "OH!"
 
 
 
  (Cow Brand Showerun shampoo)
 
  (Snow Brand Hōseki-bako ice cream)
 
 
 
  (Incorporates "Southpaw")
  (Katakura Industries)
 
 
 
  (National Pepper portable radio)
  (Nippon Ham Winny sausages)
 
  (National air conditioner)
  (National Pepper portable radio)
 "Showerun Glittering Summer" (reprise)

References

External links

1995 compilation albums
Pink Lady (band) compilation albums
Victor Entertainment compilation albums